Elizabeth Hadaway (born 1968) is a poet whose book Fire Baton won the 10th Annual Library of Virginia Literary Award for poetry. She previously published under the name Leigh Palmer. She was a Wallace Stegner Fellow at Stanford University and prior to that a Randall Jarrell Fellow at the University of North Carolina at Greensboro.

References

1968 births
Living people
Stanford University alumni
American women poets
University of North Carolina at Greensboro people
Stegner Fellows
21st-century American poets
Pseudonymous women writers
21st-century American women writers
21st-century pseudonymous writers